Oxhill or Ox Hill may refer to the following places:

Oxhill, County Durham, a village in England
Oxhill, Warwickshire, a village in England
Ox Hill, a subordinate peak of Mount Toby, in Massachusetts
Ox Hill, on the list of summits of the San Francisco Bay Area
Ox Hill, one of the neighborhoods of Norwich, Connecticut

See also
Oxon Hill